Landon Ashworth is an American actor, producer, television, movie and musical writer, film and commercial director, pilot, and golfer who is a notable celebrity in the autism spectrum disorder community. Landon is a graduate of Embry Riddle Aeronautical University and New York University's Tisch School of the Arts.

Early life 
Landon was drawn to lofty careers aspirations such as being a pilot from the get go, thanks to the fact that his great uncle Truman H. Landon was a U.S. Air Force general, commander for the U.S. Air Forces in Europe, and test pilots with John Glenn.  Growing up hearing these stories Landon set his sights on becoming an astronaut. He was also intrigued by the world of acting, which led him to star in a multitude of community theater productions starting at age 12, including The Wizard of Oz. When not daydreaming about flying, or acting Ashworth was an accomplished junior golfer.  When it was time for college, Ashworth attended and graduated from Embry Riddle Aeronautical University with a Bachelors of Science in Aeronautics, and then became a test pilot for NOAA flying whale protection missions, then to build jet hours, as a pilot for United Airlines. Once his jet hours were built up enough to apply to the NASA new hire class, hiring requirements were changed and Landon had to pivot to find his way into space. His academic advisor in undergrad told him the next mission would be Mars and NASA would be hiring someone from the field of the Arts to represent the community on that mission and his best bet would be an MFA in film or creative writing. Landon obtained an MFA in film, then transitioned into a PhD program in Astrophysics.  As fate would have it, NASA under the direction of President Obama put a hiring freeze on all new hiring classes from 2009 to 2017 rendering his education useless for almost a decade.  Landon then moved to Los Angeles to attempt a career in the arts starting in 2010 booking his breakthrough role on Castle in 2011.

Career

Early work 
In 2003, when Ashworth was still in college, he met musician Gavin Degraw and wound up playing in. a few of his concerts, as a fill in drummer on his summer tour. In 2009 Ashworth teamed back up with Degraw as his drummer for the music video "In Love with a Girl". Ashworth was also the lead in another major rock band's work, but this time as an actor, not a drummer. The All American Rejects cast him in their music video for "I Wanna". These roles led to Ashworth starring in many other music videos including one for Tristan Prettyman in 2012 entitled "I Was Going To Marry You". Early on Landon was quoted as saying, "being well versed in physics and math, I knew the odds were never in my favor auditioning so I set out to write and direct myself into the roles I wanted to play for pay. I started making sketch comedy which got me noticed at funnyordie, then started directing commercials, and then started writing a musical about the space race as a way to honor all my knowledge and training trying to become an astronaut my entire life."

Acting work

Directing work 
 Golfsmith commercial
 JH Audio commercial
 Taylormade commercial
 Callaway commercial
 TopGolf commercial
 Mastercard commercial
 SkullCandy commercial

Filmography

Television series 
 Castle (2011) 
 CSI: Miami (2012)
 Awake (2012)
 NCIS: Los Angeles (2013)
 Super Fun Night (2013)
 Code Black (2015) 
 My Haunted House (2016) 
 Days of Our Lives (2016) 
 NCIS (2018) 
 The Conan O'Brien Show (2019)
 Space Force (2020) 
 MacGruber (2021) 
 The Resident (2022)

Film and television movies 
 Role Models (2008)
Land of The Lost (2009) 
 A Warm Wind 
 The Republic of Two (2013)
 Claire (2013)
 Turn Around Jake (2014)
 Human Resources (2015)
 Silent Retreat (2016)
 Becoming Bond (2017)
Baby Splitters (2019)
 She Watches From The Woods (2021)

Nominations and awards

References

External links

LandonAshworth.com
'Never be afraid to shake the snow globe of life'
Landon Ashworth TV Commercials
Landon Ashworth
Landon Ashworth | Silver Screen Insider
Landon Ashworth

1984 births
Male actors from Illinois
American male comedians
American male film actors
American sketch comedians
American male television actors
Living people
People from Macoupin County, Illinois